Sergey Korsakov may refer to:

 Sergei Korsakoff (1854–1900), Russian neuropsychiatrist
 Sergey Korsakov (cosmonaut) (born 1984), Russian cosmonaut